Ilmenite is a titanium-iron oxide mineral with the idealized formula . It is a weakly magnetic black or steel-gray solid.  Ilmenite is the most important ore of titanium and the main source of titanium dioxide, which is used in paints, printing inks, fabrics, plastics, paper, sunscreen, food and cosmetics.

Structure and properties 
Ilmenite is a heavy (specific gravity 4.7), moderately hard (Mohs hardness 5.6 to 6), opaque black mineral with a submetallic luster. It is almost always massive, with thick tabular crystals being quite rare. It shows no discernible cleavage, breaking instead with a conchoidal to uneven fracture.

Ilmenite crystallizes in the trigonal system with space group R. The ilmenite crystal structure consists of an ordered derivative of the corundum structure; in corundum all cations are identical but in ilmenite Fe2+ and Ti4+ ions occupy alternating layers perpendicular to the trigonal c axis.

Pure ilmenite is paramagnetic (showing only very weak attraction to a magnet), but ilmenite forms solid solutions with hematite that are weakly ferromagnetic and so are noticeably attracted to a magnet. Natural deposits of ilmenite usually contain intergrown or exsolved magnetite that also contribute to its ferromagnetism.

Ilmenite is distinguished from hematite by its less intensely black color and duller appearance and its black streak, and from magnetite by its weaker magnetism.

Discovery
In 1791 William Gregor discovered a deposit of black sand in a stream that runs through the valley just south of the village of Manaccan (Cornwall), and identified for the first time titanium as one of the constituents of the main mineral in the sand. Gregor named this mineral manaccanite. The same mineral was found in the Ilmensky Mountains, near Miass, Russia, and named ilmenite.

Mineral chemistry 
Pure ilmenite has the composition . Ilmenite forms a solid solution with geikielite and pyrophanite which are magnesian and manganiferous end-members of the solid solution series.

Although ilmenite is typically close to the ideal  composition, with minor mole percentages of Mn and Mg, the ilmenites of kimberlites usually contain substantial amounts of geikielite molecules, and in some highly differentiated felsic rocks ilmenites may contain significant amounts of pyrophanite molecules.

At temperatures above , there is a complete solid solution between ilmenite and hematite. There is a miscibility gap at lower temperatures, resulting in a coexistence of these two minerals in rocks but no solid solution. This coexistence may result in exsolution lamellae in cooled ilmenites with more iron in the system than can be homogeneously accommodated in the crystal lattice. Ilmenite containing 6 to 13 percent  is sometimes described as ferrian ilmenite.

Leucoxene is an important source of titanium in heavy mineral sands ore deposits.

Paragenesis 
Ilmenite is a common accessory mineral found in metamorphic and igneous rocks. It is found in large concentrations in layered intrusions where it forms as part of a cumulate layer within the intrusion. Ilmenite generally occurs in these cumulates together with orthopyroxene or in combination with plagioclase and apatite (nelsonite).

Magnesian ilmenite is formed in kimberlites as part of the MARID association of minerals (mica-amphibole-rutile-ilmenite-diopside) assemblage of glimmerite xenoliths. Manganiferous ilmenite is found in granitic rocks and also in carbonatite intrusions where it may also contain anomalously high amounts of niobium.

Many mafic igneous rocks contain grains of intergrown magnetite and ilmenite, formed by the oxidation of ulvospinel.

Processing and consumption 

Most ilmenite is mined for titanium dioxide production. In 2011, about 47% of the titanium dioxide produced worldwide was produced from this material. Ilmenite and titanium dioxide are used in the production of titanium metal.

Titanium dioxide is most used as a white pigment and the major consuming industries for TiO2  pigments are paints and surface coatings, plastics, and paper and paperboard. Per capita consumption of TiO2 in China is about 1.1 kilograms per year, compared with 2.7 kilograms for Western Europe and the United States.

Ilmenite can be converted into pigment grade titanium dioxide  via either the sulfate process or the chloride process. Ilmenite can also be improved and purified to titanium dioxide in the form of rutile using the Becher process.

Ilmenite ores can also be converted to liquid iron and a titanium-rich slag using a smelting process.

Ilmenite ore is used as a flux by steelmakers to line blast furnace hearth refractory.

Ilmenite can be used to produce ferrotitanium via an aluminothermic reduction.

Feedstock production 

Most ilmenite is recovered from heavy mineral sands ore deposits, where the mineral is concentrated as a placer deposit and weathering reduces its iron content, increasing the percentage of titanium. However, ilmenite can also be recovered from "hard rock" titanium ore sources, such as ultramafic to mafic layered intrusions or anorthosite massifs. The ilmenite in layered intrusions is sometimes abundant, but it contains considerable intergrowths of magnetite that reduce its ore grade. Ilmenite from anorthosite massifs often contain large amounts of calcium or magnesium that render it unsuitable for the chloride process.

The proven reserves of ilmenite and rutile ore are estimated at between 423 and 600 million tonnes titanium dioxide. The largest ilmenite deposits are in South Africa, India, the United States, Canada, Norway, Australia, Ukraine, Russia and Kazakhstan. Additional deposits are found in Bangladesh, Chile, Mexico and New Zealand.

Australia was the world's largest ilmenite ore producer in 2011, with about 1.3 million tonnes of production, followed by South Africa, Canada, Mozambique, India, China, Vietnam, Ukraine, Norway, Madagascar and United States.

The top four ilmenite and rutile feedstock producers in 2010 were Rio Tinto Group, Iluka Resources, Exxaro and Kenmare Resources, which collectively accounted for more than 60% of world's supplies.

The world's two largest open cast ilmenite mines are:
 The Tellnes mine located in Sokndal, Norway, and run by Titania AS (owned by Kronos Worldwide Inc.) with 0.55 Mtpa capacity and 57 Mt contained  reserves.
 The Rio Tinto Group's Lac Tio mine located near Havre Saint-Pierre, Quebec in Canada with a 3 Mtpa capacity and 52 Mt reserves.

Major mineral sands based ilmenite mining operations include: 
 Richards Bay Minerals in South Africa, majority-owned by the Rio Tinto Group.
 Kenmare Resources' Moma mine in Mozambique.
 Iluka Resources' mining operations in Australia including Murray Basin, Eneabba and Capel.
 The Kerala Minerals & Metals Ltd (KMML), Indian Rare Earths (IRE), VV Mineral mines in India.
 TiZir Ltd.'s Grande Cote mine in Senegal
 QIT Madagascar Minerals mine, majority-owned by the Rio Tinto Group, which began production in 2009 and is expected to produce 0.75 Mtpa of ilmenite, potentially expanding to 2 Mtpa in future phases.

Attractive major potential ilmenite deposits include:
 The Karhujupukka magnetite-ilmenite deposit in Kolari, northern Finland with around 5 Mt reserves and ore containing about 6.2% titanium.
 The Balla Balla magnetite-iron-titanium-vanadium ore deposit in the Pilbara of Western Australia, which contains 456 million tonnes of cumulate ore horizon grading 45% , 13.7%  and 0.64% , one of the richest magnetite-ilmenite ore bodies in Australia
 The Coburn, WIM 50, Douglas, Pooncarie mineral sands deposits in Australia.
 The Magpie titano-magnetite (iron-titanium-vanadium-chrome) deposits in eastern Quebec of Canada with about 1 billion tonnes containing about 43% Fe, 12% TiO2, 0.4% V2O5, and 2.2% Cr2O3.
 The Longnose deposit in Northeast Minnesota is considered to be "the largest and richest ilmenite deposit in North America."

Lunar ilmenite
Ilmenite has been found in Moon rocks, and is typically highly enriched in magnesium similar to the kimberlitic association. In 2005 NASA used the Hubble Space Telescope to locate potentially ilmenite-rich locations. This mineral could be essential to an eventual Moon base, as ilmenite would provide a source of iron and titanium for the building of structures and essential oxygen extraction.

References 

Iron(II) minerals
Titanium minerals
Oxide minerals
Ilmenite group
Trigonal minerals
Minerals in space group 148
Magnetic minerals